Pseudodaphnella lemniscata is a species of sea snail, a marine gastropod mollusk in the family Raphitomidae.

Description

Distribution
This marine species occurs off Sri Lanka, Mauritius and Mindanao, the Philippines.

References

 Nevill, Journ. Asiat. Soc. Bengal 1875 11, pag. 92

External links
 
 Kilburn, R. N. (2009). Genus Kermia (Mollusca: Gastropoda: Conoidea: Conidae: Raphitominae) in South African Waters, with Observations on the Identities of Related Extralimital Species. African Invertebrates. 50(2): 217-236

lemniscata
Gastropods described in 1869